The Sociology of Sport Journal is a quarterly peer-reviewed academic journal covering the sociology of sport. It was established in 1984 and is published by Human Kinetics Publishers on behalf of the North American Society for the Sociology of Sport, of which it is the official journal. The editor-in-chief is Cheryl A. Cooky (Purdue University). According to the Journal Citation Reports, the journal has a 2021 impact factor of 2.349. Sociology of sport analyses the sport from methodological and a theoretical perspective. There are numerous different sub-sections to be examined when it comes to sociology of sport like: class, race, and gender. With sport being an international topic where different sports are being played in different countries there will always be a combination of races in any sport. The major sports followed around the world with a variety of races involved such as: basketball, soccer, baseball, football are prime examples where white, African American, and Asian people are together on the same team. Very often in sport, economic class plays less of a role due to the fact that many sports are played through elementary and high school, there are varsity teams that students, regardless of class, can participate in.

References

 "Gender Inequality in Sports & How to Grow Female Sports Audiences". Uplifter Inc. 2019-03-22. Retrieved 2021-03-23.
 Meier, Henk Erik; Uechtriz, Cosima von (2020-04-15). "The Key Role of Sport Policies for the Popularity of Women's Sports: A Case Study on Women's Soccer in Germany". Sociology of Sport Journal. 37 (4): 328–345. . 
 "Canelo Alvarez: The genesis of a boxing superstar". Boxing Junkie. 2021-02-25. Retrieved 2021-03-23.
 Hendrix, Hale (2020-12-20). "Anthony Joshua Childhood Story Plus Untold Biography Facts". Childhood Biography -. Retrieved 2021-03-23.

External links

Sociology of sport journals
Publications established in 1984
Quarterly journals
English-language journals
Academic journals associated with international learned and professional societies